The 2018–19 season was the 62nd season in RK Zamet’s history. It is their 11th successive season in the Dukat Premier League, and 41st successive top tier season.

Team

Current squad

Goalkeeper
 1  Fran Lučin
 12  Marin Sorić
 30  Tino Viskić

Wingers
RW
 5  Martin Mozetić
 6   Jakov Mozetić
 77   Filip Glavaš
LW
 2  Dujam Dunato
 10  Dario Jeličić (captain)
 22  Marko Mrakovčić

Line players
 90  Veron Načinović

Back players
LB
 7  Luka Grgurević

CB 
 8  Tin Lučin
 9  Nikola Njegovan
 17  Nikola Babić
 88  Patrik Martinović

RB
 13  Tin Tomljanović
 86  Matija Starčević

Source: Rukometstat.com

Technical staff
  President: Vedran Devčić
  Sports director: Vedran Babić
  Head Coach: Nedjeljko Lalić
  Assistant Coach: Marin Mišković
  Goalkeeper Coach: Valter Matošević
  Fizioterapist: Dragan Marijanović
  Fitness coach: Milan Rončević
  Team Manager: Boris Konjuh

Competitions

Overall

Last updated: 1 June 2019

Dukat Premier League

League table

Updated to match(es) played on 10 March 2019. Source: Premijer liga Rezultati.com

Matches

Relegation play-offs

League table

Updated to match(es) played on 1 June 2019. This table contains statistics combined with the regular part of the Dukat Premier League with matches played by team in the relegation play-offs. Source:  SportCom.hr

Matches

Croatian Cup

PGŽ Cup - Qualifier matches

Matches

Friendly matches

Pre-season  matches

Mid-season matches

Transfers

In

Out

Sources
Hrs.hr
Rk-zamet.hr
SportCom.hr
Sport.net.hr
Rezultati.com

References

RK Zamet seasons